Christopher Pate is an Australian actor. He was nominated for the 1977 AFI Award for Best Actor in a Supporting Role for his role in Raw Deal.

In 1966, he starred on the TV Western Gunsmoke as Curtis in S12E8’s “The Whistling Gate”! Pate had a regular role in the early 70s on the TV series Bellbird. In 1977 he played the lead role in The Mango Tree which was written and produced by his father Michael Pate. He has appeared on stage in such musicals as Hair and Little Shop of Horrors and played in the original Australian production of Godspell

References

External links
 
 Biographical cuttings on Christopher Pate, actor, containing one or more cuttings from newspapers or journals at the National Library of Australia.

Australian male film actors
Australian male television actors
Living people
Date of birth missing (living people)
1949 births